Pseudochromis omanensis, is a species of ray-finned fish from the Western Indian Ocean around central and southern Oman , and the Socotra Archipelago, which is a member of the family Pseudochromidae.

The fish was named by Anthony C. Gill & Jonathan Kevin Lorne Mee in 1993.

References

omanensis
Taxa named by Anthony C. Gill
Fish described in 1993